Shia Islam in Canada is a part of the global Shia community that continues to bond with Shias elsewhere. Shia Muslims have been a featuring segment of the Canadian Muslim society that became more conspicuous from the 1970s and onwards.

Community
The Shia Muslim community (jamaat) manifests itself in two main forms in Canada. One is through the Twelver (Ithnaasheri) rite and the other is through the Ismaili (Sevener) rite. However, due to the lack of census questions that go into specific details in Canada, it remains unknown which community is larger between the two. However, both have established community centres encompassing spiritual congregational halls and attached leisure centres. The Shia Ithnaasheris have Masjids (Mosques) and the Shia Ismailis have Jamatkhanas in the country. The two most prominent Ismaili centre is the Ismaili Centre, Toronto (ICT) at the Charbagh Gardens and Ismaili Centre, Burnaby (ICV), while the most prominent Ithna Ashari centre is the Jaffari Community Centre (JCC) in Vaughan, Ontario.

Population 
The Shiite population in Canada is estimated to be approximately 300,000 people. The arrival of Shiite Muslims in this country is because of the migration of Shiites from countries such as Iran/Pakistan/Lebanon, and other countries that have settled there, and most of the mentioned population lives in cities such as Toronto, Montreal, and Vancouver.

Adherents
Reza Hosseini Nassab is a Canadian Grand Ayatollah of the Twelver rite. Anisa Mehdi, a film director and journalist, who although a Shia, reports on her faith from a Pan-Islamic viewpoint.

Notable Canadian Shia Muslims 
 Amir Attaran - lawyer, immunologist and law professor
 Maziar Bahari - journalist, filmmaker and human rights activist
 Farid Haerinejad - documentary maker and blogger
 Salma Lakhani - Lieutenant Governor of Alberta
 Mobina Jaffer - lawyer, British Columbia senator
 Rahim Jaffer - former Alberta Member of Parliament
 Amir Khadir - National Assembly member and former Québec Solidaire co-spokesperson
 Hassan Khosrowshahi - founder of electronics retailer Future Shop
 Rizwan Manji - television and film actor
 Anisa Mehdi - Emmy Award winning film director and journalist
 Reza Hosseini Nassab - Grand Ayatollah
 Naheed Nenshi - non-profit sector consultant, mayor of Calgary
 Yasmin Ratansi - accountant, MP; first Muslim woman elected to the House of Commons of Canada
 Omar Sachedina -  television journalist and newsreader
 Aliza Vellani -  television actress (Little Mosque on the Prairie)
 Ali Velshi - television journalist now working in the US
 Alykhan Velshi - lawyer and former political advisor to Stephen Harper
 Murad Velshi -  former member of the Ontario Legislative Assembly, father of Ali Velshi
 Sayid Naqawe -  President and Founder of the Al-Fatema Islamic Center of Ontario.
 Rana Bokhari- Lawyer, Former Leader of Manitoba Liberal Party, Anti-Racism Activist.

See also
Ismaili Centre, Toronto
Aza-e-Hussain Association BC
Ismaili Centre, Burnaby
Ahlul Bayt Assembly of Canada
List of Canadian Shia Muslims
Shia Islam in El Salvador
Shia Islam in Botswana

References

External links
 www.islamabc.org